The Twenty-fourth Amendment of the Constitution Bill 2001 (bill no. 19 of 2001) was a proposed amendment to the Constitution of Ireland to allow the state to ratify the Treaty of Nice of the European Union. The proposal was rejected in a referendum held in June 2001, sometimes referred to as the first Nice referendum. The referendum was held on the same day as referendums on the prohibition of the death penalty and on the ratification of the Rome Statute of the International Criminal Court, both of which were approved.

The Nice Treaty was subsequently approved by Irish voters when the Twenty-sixth Amendment was approved in the second Nice referendum, held in 2002.

Background
The Treaty of Nice was signed by the member states of the European Union in February 2001, amending the Treaties of the European Union. Under the decision of the Supreme Court in Crotty v. An Taoiseach (1987), an amendment to the Constitution was required before it could be ratified by Ireland. Ireland was the only one of the then 15 EU member states to put the Treaty to the people in a referendum.

Proposed changes to the text
Insertion of the following subsections in Article 29.4:

Renumbering of subsections 7º and 8º of Article 29.4 as subsections 9º and 10º.

Oireachtas debate
The Twenty-fourth Amendment was proposed in Dáil Éireann by Minister for Foreign Affairs Brian Cowen on behalf of the Fianna Fáil–Progressive Democrats coalition government led by Taoiseach Bertie Ahern. It was supported by opposition parties Fine Gael and the Labour Party, while it was opposed by the Green Party, Sinn Féin and the Socialist Party, as well as Independent TD Tony Gregory. It passed final stages in the Dáil on 2 May, with insufficient opposition to force a roll call vote. It passed final stages in the Seanad on 4 May and proceeded to a referendum on 11 June 2001.

Campaign
A Referendum Commission was established by Minister for the Environment and Local Government Noel Dempsey. It was chaired by former Chief Justice Thomas Finlay. At the time, its role included setting out the arguments for and against the proposal.

Result

Aftermath
The functions of the Referendum Commission were altered by the Referendum Act 2001, so that it would no longer set out arguments on either side of a proposal.

A second referendum was held on the Nice Treaty in October 2002, and the voters approved of the Twenty-sixth Amendment. Because of concerns that the Treaty would affect Irish neutrality, a further subsection was included on that occasion to address these fears.

See also
Constitution of Ireland
Politics of the Republic of Ireland
Seville Declarations on the Treaty of Nice

References

External links
Full text of the Constitution of Ireland
Oireachtas debates: Twenty-fourth Amendment of the Constitution Bill 2001

2001 in international relations
2001 in Irish law
2001 in Irish politics
2001 referendums
Euroscepticism in Ireland
24
Ireland Amendments of the Constitution
24
Ireland, 24
June 2001 events in Europe
Amendment, 24